Zarya, full name Aleksandra Zaryanova, appears as a playable character in the first-person shooter video game Overwatch, developed in 2016 by Blizzard Entertainment. Zarya also appears as a playable character in the crossover multiplayer online battle arena game Heroes of the Storm. She is voiced by Dolya Gavanski.

Concept and creation
Aleksandra Zaryanova, or Zarya for short, is a Russian powerlifter and soldier. She was initially conceived for Overwatch by artist Arnold Tsang after watching a weightlifting competition. He recognized that the body shape of weightlifters was non-standard but would make for a great, tough female hero. She was created in part to satisfy calls from fans to add more diverse body types after the initial set of heroes were revealed for the game. Her design was inspired by one of Blizzard's 3D artists, Tamara Bakhlycheva, particularly her pink pixie cut hairstyle. Overwatch director Jeff Kaplan noted her as an example of how character designs challenge the stereotypes of their character types. She is armed with a Particle Cannon that can either emit a continuous beam of energy or launch an energy projectile in an arc. She is also able to project a personal Particle Barrier onto herself or onto one of her teammates (Projected Barrier), and soaking up damage with these barriers raises the power of her own attacks proportionally. Zarya's ultimate ability, Graviton Surge, forms a gravity well that pulls enemies in and damages them, leaving them open to other attacks. Zarya is voiced by Dolya Gavanski.

One of Zarya's in-game voice lines is derived from an internet meme, which is derived from quotation by professional hockey player Ilya Bryzgalov in a post game interview while he was a member of the Anaheim Ducks in 2006.

During the 2022 Russian invasion of Ukraine, Blizzard removed the "Z" symbol on various Zarya skins, as the symbol had become representative of pro-Russian war position.

Appearances

Overwatch 
Zarya appears in the 2016 video game Overwatch. Her backstory has her in a village in Siberia was on the front lines of the Omnic Crisis, which devastated the region. As she grew older, she swore to gain the strength to protect her people and homeland. She became a bodybuilder and weightlifter, expected to break a number of records in the world championships, but the dormant omnium in Siberia awakened on the eve of the tournament, and she withdrew from the competition to join the local defense forces.

Heroes of the Storm 
Zarya was added to Heroes of the Storm during the Machines of War event in September 2016, as a second Overwatch hero. In the game, she plays the role of a Support. Zarya's kit in the game is similar to her Overwatch abilities, including her main weapon Particle Cannon, Personal Barrier, Shield Ally, as well as her heroic ability Gravition Surge. Second heroic ability, called Expulsion Zone, had first appearance in Heroes of the Storm. Her trait Energy works in the same way as in Overwatch - any damage absorbed by her shields contributes to her energy meter to increase her damage output.

Reception
Since her reveal, Zarya has received generally positive reception, and is one of the most popular characters in the game. She has been compared to other Russian characters in fiction, including Ivan Drago from Rocky IV, Galina "Red" Reznikov from Orange is the New Black, and the Heavy from Team Fortress 2. Tim Mulkerin of Mic ranked her the second best Overwatch character, praising the "seamlessness" of her masculine and feminine qualities and calling her "charismatic" and strong. He did note that her "arguably discriminatory" attitude towards Omnics (artificially intelligent robots in Overwatch) made her his "ultimate problematic fave." Zebbie Watson of Inverse praised her outfit as an example of good armor on women in Overwatch. Mike Williams of USGamer found her alternate skins in Overwatch to be either "boring" or "dire," but praised her Hanamura skin she has in Heroes of the Storm as being an exception to this.

Zarya has become a gay icon for Overwatch players. Cecilia D'Anastasio of Kotaku noted this as ironic, suggesting that if Zarya was gay, she would likely not be as patriotic towards Russia as she is. When it was confirmed that there were multiple LGBTQ characters in Overwatch, Tim Mulkerin of Mic speculated that Zarya could possibly be one of them. Jess Joho of Killscreen speculated that Zarya may have originally been a man, and had her design changed to that of a woman in response to fan outcry. She noted that if she was gay and had colored hair, she would not be able to live freely in Russia, which she feels makes her "incredible" and that Zarya's design helped advance the conversation, suggesting that Zarya could represent a Russia where people like Zarya can live more freely.

References

Female characters in animated films
Female characters in comics
Female characters in video games
Fictional female military personnel
Fictional military personnel in video games
Fictional Russian people in video games
Fictional Russian military personnel
Fictional bodybuilders
Overwatch characters
Video game characters introduced in 2016
Woman soldier and warrior characters in video games